Mboa, also known as Mbonga, is an apparently extinct language of Cameroon. Ethnologue reports 1,490 speakers cited to 2000, possibly the ethnic population.

References

Languages of Cameroon
Extinct languages of Africa
Jarawan languages